Elections for Boston Borough Council, which covers the Borough of Boston, were held on 3 May 2007. The Boston Bypass Independents won the election in a landslide victory with 25 seats, the first party ever to take overall control of the council since the borough was formed in 1973. It was a single-issue party campaigning on getting a bypass for Boston. All the Labour and Liberal Democrat councillors lost their seats, with only five Conservatives and two Independents also elected. The turnout was  36.9%. The overall results, were as follows:

Ward-by-Ward Results:

Ward-by-Ward Results

Central Ward (1 seat)

Coastal Ward (2 seats)

Fenside Ward (2 seats)

Fishtoft Ward (3 seats)

Five Village Ward (2 seats)

Frampton & Holme Ward (1 seat)

Kirton Ward (2 seats)

North Ward (2 seats)

Old Leake & Wrangle Ward (2 seats)

Pilgrim Ward (1 seat)

Skirbeck Ward (3 seats)

South Ward (1 seat)

Staniland North Ward (1 seat)

Staniland South Ward (2 seats)

Swineshead & Holland Fen Ward (2 seats)

West Ward (1 seat)

Witham Ward (2 seats)

Wyberton Ward (2 seats)

References
Election 2007: Winning Candidates (Elections)
2007 Boston election result
Bypass group wins race for Boston
Political 'earthquake' shakes council

2007 English local elections
2007
2000s in Lincolnshire
May 2007 events in the United Kingdom